Dhuandhaar is a 2021 Gujarati thriller film starring Malhar Thakar, Netri Trivedi, Alisha Prajapati, Dimple Biscuitwala and Hiten Kumar. The film is written and directed by Rehan Chaudhary. and produced by Jeegar Chauhan and Rajesh Thakkar

Cast 

 Malhar Thakar
 Netri Trivedi
 Alisha Prajapati
 Dimple Biscuitwala
 Hiten Kumar

Soundtrack 

The songs of the film are composed by Kedar - Bhargav. Lyrics are penned by Bhargav Purohit.

Release 
The film was released on 17 September 2021.

Reception
Yesha Bhatt, writing for Times of India, praised the film for its "deviation from the usual romcoms" that the industry has been making. She noted that the film "get slightly slow" after interval "but it delivers an absolute punch in the gut at the climax". She praised the cinematography, but criticized the screenplay and characterization.

References

External links
 

2021 films
2020s Gujarati-language films
Films set in Ahmedabad
Films shot in Ahmedabad
Films shot in Gujarat
2021 thriller films